The Centre de services scolaire des Grandes-Seigneuries is a francophone school service centre in the Canadian province of Quebec. It comprises several primary schools and high schools across municipalities in the Vallée-du-Haut-Saint-Laurent (Montérégie) region.

Territory

District no 1 
Municipalités :
 Hemmingford 
 Mercier 
 Napierville 
 Saint-Bernard-de-Lacolle 
 Saint-Cyprien-de-Napierville 
 Saint-Édouard 
 Saint-Isidore 
 Saint-Michel 
 Saint-Patrice-de-Sherrington 
 Saint-Rémi 
 Sainte-Clotilde

District no 2 
Municipies :
 Saint-Constant 
 Saint-Mathieu

District no 3 
Municipies :
 Châteauguay 
 Kahnawake 
 Léry

District no 4 
Municipies :
 Candiac 
 Delson 
 Sainte-Catherine

District no 5 
Municipies :
 La Prairie 
 Saint-Philippe

External links
scolaire des Grandes-Seigneuries

References

School districts in Quebec
Education in Montérégie